Ienăchiță Văcărescu (1740 – 11 July 1797) was a Wallachian Romanian poet, historian, philologist, and boyar belonging to the Văcărescu family. A polyglot, he was able to speak Ancient and Modern Greek, Old Church Slavonic, Arabic, Persian, French, German, Italian, and Ottoman Turkish.

Biography
Văcărescu wrote one of the first printed books on Romanian grammar in 1787, an edition which also included a section dedicated to the study of prosody; it was titled Observaţii sau băgări de seamă asupra regulilor şi orânduielilor gramaticii româneşti ("Observations or Reckonings on the Rules and Dispositions of Romanian Grammar"). He also completed a work on Greek grammar (Gramatica greacă completă).

Văcărescu's lyrical works take inspiration from both Anacreon and folklore, and center on romantic love. The best-known poems he left behind are Amărâta turturea ("Embittered Turtle Dove") and the minuscule Într-o grădină ("In a Garden"). Aside from these, he was also the author of a Istorie a Preaputernicilor Împăraţi Otomani ("History of the All Mighty Ottoman Emperors").

On several occasions, Ienăchiţă Văcărescu served Wallachia as a diplomat in missions abroad, including negotiations carried out in the Habsburg realms for the sons of Prince Alexander Ypsilantis to return after their 1782 flight to Vienna; he met and conversed with Emperor Joseph II, and also befriended the French ambassador, Baron de Breteuil. His impressive knowledge of Italian was the subject of a 1929 study by historian Nicolae Iorga, De unde a învăţat italieneşte Ienăchiţă Văcărescu ("Where Has Ienăchiţă Văcărescu Learned His Italian From?").

References

Neagu Djuvara, Între Orient şi Occident. Ţările române la începutul epocii moderne, Humanitas, Bucharest, 1995, p. 345

1740 births
1797 deaths
Romanian diplomats
18th-century Romanian historians
Linguists from Romania
18th-century Romanian poets
Romanian male poets
Burials at Bellu Cemetery
Ienachita
18th-century male writers